The Frank Capra Achievement Award is an American film award established by the Directors Guild of America (DGA) honoring assistant directors and unit production managers for career achievement and service to the DGA. Named after the American director Frank Capra (1897–1991), it was first awarded at the 32nd Directors Guild of America Awards in 1980.

Recipients

References

External links 

 DGA Awards History

Awards established in 1980
American film awards
Directors Guild of America Awards